Piwi+ (formerly Piwi) is a French pay television channel for children aged 3 to 6, owned by the Canal+ Group.

History
Piwi was first launched on October 20, 2002 as a preschool block on Télétoon for Les Minitoons, and then on December 3, 2003 as the preschool channel from Télévision Par Satellite. In 2007, TPS merged with its competitor Canalsat.

In 2016-2017, Piwi+ became a Canal+ exclusive all around the world. It is also distributed on VOO in Belgium and Teleclub Les + in Switzerland.

The Happy Planet series
Happy Planet is a French-Canadian media franchise for preschoolers which debuted in Canada on July 10, 2001, and then in France on October 9, 2002.

Television movies
The first movie, Happy Planet, premiered in Canada on Télé-Québec and TFO on October 28, 2001, and then in France on France 5 as part of Les Zouzous block and Télétoon on March 10, 2002.

The second movie, Happy Planet: Le Tour du Monde, premiered in Canada on October 20, 2002, and then in France on March 9, 2003.

Television shows
The show, originally airing as Les Vacances de Piwi for its first two seasons, premiered in Canada on Télé-Québec and TFO on July 9, 2002, and then in France on France 5 as part of Les Zouzous block and Télétoon as part of the Piwi block on October 20, 2002. 

The show was renewed for a second season, which premiered in Canada on January 7, 2003, and then in France on April 8, 2003. 

A third season was renewed one year after, leading to the series being renamed as Les Aventures de Piwi for its last two seasons, premiered in Canada on Télé-Québec and TFO on July 8, 2003, and then in France on France 5 as part of Les Zouzous programming block and Télétoon as part of the Piwi block on October 19, 2003.

The show was renewed for a fourth season, which premiered in Canada on January 6, 2004, and then in France on April 7, 2004.

Mascots
Soleil
Voiced by: Naïke Fauveau (2002-2004), Lucile Boulanger (2005-2011)
Color:  Yellow
Soleil is a 3-year-old female Piwi with yellow body and orange rays. She is the adventurous leader of the group.
Gourmand
Voiced by: Brigitte Guedj (2002-2004), Lara Saarbach (2005-2011)
Color:  Orange
Gourmand is a 6-year-old male Piwi with orange body and green bubbles. He is the silly clown of the group.
Étoile
Voiced by: Caroline Combes (2002-2004), Annabelle Roux (2005-2011)
Color:  Violet
Étoile is a 6-year-old female Piwi with violet body and yellow feathers. She is the cutest princess of the group.
Radar
Voiced by: Valérie Lecot (2002-2004), Annabelle Roux (2005-2011)
Color:  Indigo
Radar is a 8-year-old male Piwi with indigo body with red satellites. He is the athletic superhero of the group.
Ventouse
Voiced by: Fily Keita (2002-2004), Annabelle Roux (2005-2011)
Color:  Green
Ventouse is a 7-year-old female Piwi with green body and red suction cups. She is the sweetest gymnast of the group.
Ressort
Voiced by: Sauvane Delanoë (2002-2004), Lara Saarbach (2005-2011)
Color:  Red
Ressort is a 9-year-old female Piwi with red body and indigo springs. She is the friendliest cheerleader of the group.
Peinture
Voiced by: Blanche Ravalec (2002-2004), Kelly Marot (2005-2011)
Color:  Blue
Peinture is a 5-year-old male Piwi with blue body and yellow fountain tanks. He is the smartest artist of the group.

Production
The Happy Planet series were produced by Montreal-based animation company EnSky Studios, notable for the Smart Planet series and was the company's first production to use a new Alias Wavefront Maya animation software. Rendering was done with Mental Ray, while compositing work was completed in Adobe Premiere and Media Composer. Most backgrounds were modeled in 3D, with geometry sculpted with Discreet 3ds Max and texturing done with Adobe Photoshop; one method of replicating the source material's visual style was through black edging 3D objects with Toon Shader. There were also 2D animated backgrounds and visual effects created with Adobe After Effects and Avid DS. The characters are animated in high quality 3D, while objects in the backgrounds are black edged to give them a 2D cartoon feel.

See also

Television in France

References

External links
 Archive of Piwi TV Official Website
 Piwi + Official website

Television stations in France
French-language television stations
Television channels and stations established in 2002
Television channels and stations established in 2003
Children's television networks
Preschool education television networks